William Craig Mooneyham (August 16, 1960) was an American professional baseball pitcher for the Oakland Athletics of the Major League Baseball (MLB).

Mooneyham attended Merced College. He was originally drafted in 1980 Major League Baseball draft in the 1st round (10th overall), and made his MLB debut on April 19, 1986, with Oakland. He played for only one season in the MLB, for which he was paid $60,000.

In the minor leagues he played for the Salinas Spurs of the Class A California League in 1980 and the Holyoke Millers of the class AA Eastern League in 1981. He also played for Edmonton, Nashua, Modesto, Huntsville and Tacoma.

He worked as a Physical Education teacher at Weaver Middle School in Merced, California until 2022, when he retired.

References

MLB Statistics
Baseball Gauge
Retrosheet
Venezuelan Professional Baseball League

1960 births
Living people
American expatriate baseball players in Canada
Baseball players from California
Denver Zephyrs players
Edmonton Trappers players
El Paso Diablos players
Holyoke Millers players
Huntsville Stars players
Leones del Caracas players
American expatriate baseball players in Venezuela
Major League Baseball pitchers
Merced Blue Devils baseball players
Merced College alumni
Modesto A's players
Nashua Angels players
Oakland Athletics players
People from Livermore, California
Salinas Angels players
Tacoma Tigers players